Dianne Lesley Pilkington (born 7 June 1975) is an English theatre actress and singer.

Personal life
Pilkington was born in Wigan. She trained at the Guildford School of Acting, graduating in 1997 with the Principal's Award.

Pilkington married Claude Pelletier, on 10 October 2010.  Pilkington gave birth to their son, Hugo, on 26 December 2012.

The couple later divorced, and Pilkington married actor Neil Roberts in September 2020.

Theatre
Pilkington has had an impressive career beginning in 1997 when she joined the West End production of Les Misérables, Pilkington understudied the role of Fantine whilst in the production.

Following Les Misérables, Pilkington starred in the production of Tess, going on tour with the show prior to it appearing at the Savoy, she played the role of Marion. The production only ran for 10 weeks in the West End before closing on 8 January 2000.

Pilkington joined the cast of Sweeney Todd at the Bridewell Theatre later in 2000, a production she had played the role of Mrs Lovett in whilst training at GSA.

In late 2000 Pilkington was part of the original London cast of Andrew Lloyd Webber's, The Beautiful Game.  She played the role of the Protestant girl as well as understudying the role of Bernadette.

In 2002 Pilkington originated the role of Kim in Boy George's musical Taboo.  She appeared alongside Boy George at the Royal Albert Hall alongside other members of the original London cast.

It was in late 2002 that Pilkington joined the UK touring production of Beauty and the Beast playing Belle. She remained with the production into 2003.

Again in 2003 Pilkington originated another role in the West End, this time in Rod Stewart musical Tonight's the Night, as Mary at the Victoria Palace Theatre.

For the Christmas panto season of 2004–2005 Pilkington starred in the leading role in Snow White and the Seven Dwarfs opposite Lily Savage.

In 2005 Pilkington starred in The Far Pavilions in the role of Belinda.  Following this Pilkington again went on tour in the role of Grizabella in Andrew Lloyd Webber's, Cats.  It was whilst on tour with the production that Pilkington met her husband.

After leaving the Cats tour in early 2007, Pilkington joined the West End production of Wicked at the Apollo Victoria Theatre. She replaced Helen Dallimore as Glinda on 16 July 2007, after serving as the standby from April of that year. After three years in the company, she played her final performance on 27 March 2010 and was succeeded by Louise Dearman.

Immediately after leaving Wicked, Pilkington joined played the parts of Annabella Schmidt, Pamela, and Margaret in the West End production of The 39 Steps. She replaced Natalie Walter on 26 April 2010. She ended her nine-month run on 29 January 2011 and was succeeded by Laura Rogers.

After leaving The 39 Steps Pilkington took part in the 2011 season of Cabaret in the House at Lauderdale House on 20 February 2011, performing many tracks from her album in a one-woman cabaret, her guests at the cabaret included Jean-Claude Pelletier, Shimi Goodman & television actress Nicole Faraday. She was accompanied on piano by Christopher Hamilton.

In the Chichester Festival 2011 Pilkington played the role of Amalia in She Loves Me, from 9 May 2011 until 18 June 2011.

She starred as Sophie De Palma in the West End production of Master Class, which ran at the Vaudeville Theatre from January – April 2012.

It was announced in April 2013 that Pilkington would take over the role Donna Sheridan in Mamma Mia! at the Novello Theatre beginning 10 June 2013. After playing Donna for three years, Pilkington departed the show on 11 June 2016 and was replaced by Linzi Hateley. The following year, she played Aunt Lily in the musical Whisper House at The Other Palace. Pilkington portrayed Elizabeth Benning in the London production of Young Frankenstein, which premiered at Theatre Royal, Newcastle in August 2017 and then transferred the following month to the Garrick Theatre.
Pilkington created the role of ‘Raquel’in the musical of Only Fools And Horses, written by Jim Sullivan and Paul Whitehouse. She performed the role from February 2019 to February 2020 at the Haymarket Theatre, London.
In June 2021 it was announced that Pilkington would be creating the role of Eglantine Price in the new Bedknobs and Broomsticks adaptation, a collaboration between Disney and Michael Harrison, Directed by Candace Edmunds and Jamie Harrison, Written by Neil Bartram and Brian Hill.
The tour completed in May 2022.

Pilkington has undertaken many musical workshops including: ‘Hope’ in the London workshop production of Urinetown, directed by John Rando; ‘Tonya’ in the workshop of Dr Zhivago directed by Des McAnuff; the title role in Helen of Troy – a new musical, directed by Gary Griffin; ‘Charlotte’ in Charlotte — Life or Theatre?; 'Meg' in the workshop of Andrew Lloyd Webber's new musical Love Never Dies.  Pilkington took part in the workshop of a new musical based on Pride and Prejudice, by Jane Austen

Film
Pilkington was due to play the role of a Blind Opera Singer in 2010's The Wolfman, opposite Benicio del Toro, but her scene had been cut from the final version of the film. However, the scene was included in the Director's Cut DVD version.

In July 2012 it was announced that Pilkington would appear in the new Les Misérables movie, directed by Tom Hooper.  Pilkington was credited as Inn Whore 1 appearing in the Master of the House scene opposite Helena Bonham Carter and Sacha Baron Cohen.  Her former Wicked co-star Kerry Ellis appears in the same scene.

Television
Pilkington's television credits include appearing on the West End edition of  The Weakest Link, which aired 31 December 2008.  Pilkington came in a respectable 4th place. She also appeared on Britain's Got Talent giving a brief tour of Wicked, on This Morning performing Popular with Alexia Khadime and on The Alan Titchmarsh Show discussing reality TV shows such as Over The Rainbow.

During the pandemic of 2020-21, Pilkington filmed ‘Innocent’ for ITV, playing Alison Walker, and had a guest role in Holby City, playing Shelley Wilder.

Awards
Pilkington was nominated in the "Best Takeover Role" category for her role in Wicked at the 2008 Theatregoer's Choice Awards, but lost to co-star Kerry Ellis. She and Alexia Khadime won the "Art and Culture Woman of the Future" category at the 2009 Women of the Future Awards. Pilkington also won the Broadwayworld.com UK Award for Best Lead Actress in a Play for The 39 Steps.

Theatre credits

Discography

Album
Pilkington's début solo album, entitled Little Stories, was released in December 2010.

(*) Previously Unrecorded

All songs performed by Dianne Pilkington and Accompanied on the Piano by Chris Hamilton.

References

External links
 

1975 births
Alumni of the Guildford School of Acting
Living people
English musical theatre actresses
English women singers
People from Wigan